Pakistan participated in the 1994 Asian Games in Hiroshima, Japan from  2 to 16 October 1994. It ranked twenty second in the medal tally. Half of its total medals were in Boxing, with its boxers winning 3 silvers medals and 2 bronze medals.

References

Nations at the 1994 Asian Games
1994
Asian Games